Houchin is a surname. Notable people with the surname include:

Charlie Houchin (born 1987), American swimmer
Erin Houchin (born 1976), American politician

See also
 Houchin

Surnames of French origin